Sabrina Scharf Schiller (born Sandra Mae Trentman, October 17, 1943) is an American actress, lawyer, real estate developer, and activist best known for her roles on American television shows.

Born in Delphos, Ohio, she moved with her mother to Arizona, eventually living in Tucson. She eloped with her algebra teacher at age 15. The marriage was annulled three years later. She later worked as a theatrical assistant in New York, then became a Playboy Bunny beginning in 1962. She appeared in the movie Easy Rider and guest-starred in the third-season episode of the original Star Trek, "The Paradise Syndrome".

After Scharf quit acting in the 1970s, she became an anti-pollution activist and unsuccessfully ran for the California State Senate. She was married to television writer Bob Schiller until his death in 2017.

Scharf became an attorney in 1989. As of 2017 she works in real estate in the Los Angeles area.

Filmography

Films

Television

References

External links
 

1943 births
American television actresses
Living people
20th-century American actresses
American lawyers
People from Delphos, Ohio
People from Pacific Palisades, California
21st-century American women